Soul Mechanic is a 2020 South Korean television series starring Shin Ha-kyun, Jung So-min, Tae In-ho and Park Ye-jin. It aired on KBS2 from May 6 to June 25, 2020.

Synopsis
A team of psychiatrists who believe in healing, and not just treating sick patients. Lee Shi-joon (Shin Ha-kyun) is happy to deal with living in a crazy world by being his eccentric self and leaning on humor to reach out to patients. He ends up being assigned a problem patient, Han Woo-joo (Jung So-min), a musical rising star with terrible anger management issues.

Cast

Main
 Shin Ha-kyun as Lee Shi-joon
 Jung So-min as Han Woo-joo
 Tae In-ho as In Dong-hyuk
 Park Ye-jin as Ji Young-won

Supporting
 Joo Min-kyung as Gong Ji-sun
 Jo Kyung-sook as Jo In-hye
 Park Soo-young as Oh Ki-tae
 Jung Hae-kyun as Park Dae-ha
 Choi Jung-woo as Lee Taek-kyung
 Park Hyun-suk as Oh Hwa-young
 Ahn Dong-goo as No Woo-jung
 Park Han-sol as Gong Ji-hee
 Kim Kang-min as Kim Young-seok
 Shin Ha-young as Kang Neu-ri
 Baek Soo-hee as Kim Yoo-ra
 Jang Yoo-sang as Im Se-chan
 Oh Yoon-hong as Doctor
 Kang Shin-il as Gu Won-sook
 Kim Ga-ran as Jang Yoo-mi
 Ji Joo-yeon as Jung Se-yeon
 Kim Hyun as Patient
 Park Sang-hoon as Park Luo (Patient)

Special appearances
 Wi Ha-joon
 Lee Sung-min
 Kim Dong-young as Cha Dong-il
 Ban Hyo-jung
 Kim Hye-eun
 Ryu Si-won

Original soundtrack

Part 1

Part 2

Part 3

Part 4

Part 5

Part 6

Ratings
In this table,  represent the lowest ratings and  represent the highest ratings.

Notes

References

External links
  
 
 
 

Korean Broadcasting System television dramas
2020 South Korean television series debuts
2020 South Korean television series endings
Korean-language television shows
South Korean medical television series
Television about mental health
Television series by Imagine Asia
Television series by Monster Union